Mehdi Kamrani (born June 1, 1982, in Ray, Iran) is an Iranian professional basketball player.

Career statistics

|-
|style="text-align:left;"|2014–15
|style="text-align:left;"|Jiangsu Monkey King
|35||34||37.1||.463||.339||.745||3.5||5.2||2.8||0.1||16.4
|-
|style="text-align:left;"|2015–16
|style="text-align:left;"|Beikong Fly Dragons
|34||34||39.4||.447||.380||.675||4.6||6.5||2.8||0.1||19.3
|}

Honours

National team
Asian Championship
Gold medal: 2007, 2009, 2013
 Asian Games
Bronze medal: 2006, 2010
 Islamic Solidarity Games
Bronze medal: 2005
 Asian Indoor Games
Gold medal: 2009

Club
 Asian Championship
Gold medal: 2008 (Saba Battery), 2009, 2010 (Mahram)
 West Asian Championship
Gold medal: 2009, 2010, 2012 (Mahram)
 Iranian Basketball Super League
Champions: 2004 (Saba Battery), 2008, 2009, 2010, 2011, 2012 (Mahram)

References

External links
 Kamrani profile at FIBA
 Kamarni at Basketball.Asia-Basket.com
Kamrani on Instagram
Kamrani on Facebook

1982 births
Living people
Asian Games silver medalists for Iran
Asian Games bronze medalists for Iran
Asian Games medalists in basketball
Basketball players at the 2006 Asian Games
Basketball players at the 2008 Summer Olympics
Basketball players at the 2010 Asian Games
Basketball players at the 2014 Asian Games
Beijing Royal Fighters players
Iranian expatriate basketball people in China
Iranian men's basketball players
Nanjing Tongxi Monkey Kings players
Jilin Northeast Tigers players
Mahram Tehran BC players
Medalists at the 2006 Asian Games
Medalists at the 2010 Asian Games
Medalists at the 2014 Asian Games
Olympic basketball players of Iran
Sportspeople from Tehran
Point guards
2014 FIBA Basketball World Cup players
2010 FIBA World Championship players
Islamic Solidarity Games competitors for Iran